True Wealth: How and Why Millions of Americans are Creating a Time-Rich, Ecologically Light, Small-Scale, High-Satisfaction Economy is a 2010 book by Juliet Schor that argues for a redefinition of wealth based on allocation of free time, making things for oneself, environmentally-aware consumption, and stronger social connections.

It was originally published as Plenitude: The New Economics of True Wealth and retitled for its paperback edition.

References

Bibliography

External links 

 Full text from the Internet Archive

2010 non-fiction books
English-language books
Penguin Press books
Economics books
Consumerism
Wealth
Books by Juliet Schor